Charles E. Williams  (born September 5, 1943) is an American former professional basketball player born in Colorado Springs, Colorado.  A 6’0” guard from Stadium High School (Tacoma) and Seattle University, he played in the American Basketball Association (which later joined the NBA in the ABA-NBA merger) in the late 1960s and early 1970s. The highlight of his career was in 1968, when he teamed with Connie Hawkins to lead the Pittsburgh Pipers to the 1968 ABA Championship. Williams also played in the 1969 and 1970 ABA All-Star Games. He retired in 1973 with 6,020 total points and a career scoring average of 16.2 points per game.

References

External links
Career Stats

1943 births
Living people
American men's basketball players
Basketball players from Colorado Springs, Colorado
Memphis Pros players
Memphis Tams players
Minnesota Pipers players
Pittsburgh Pipers players
Pittsburgh Condors players
Point guards
Seattle Redhawks men's basketball players
Shooting guards
Utah Stars players